Lindsey Stevens (born August 27, 1995) is an American born but Australian raised Canadian rugby union player. He plays as a hooker for the Chicago Hounds of Major League Rugby (MLR) and the Canadian national team.

References

External links
itsrugby.co.uk profile

Canadian rugby union players
Canada international rugby union players
1995 births
Living people
People from Dripping Springs, Texas
Rugby union hookers
Houston SaberCats players
New Orleans Gold players
LA Giltinis players
Chicago Hounds (rugby union) players